Antonello Padovano, is an Italian film director and producer. He is currently the director of Hands That Should Be Farming Productions based in England. Padovano won the 2019 Bayern 2 - Audience Prize at the Tegernsee International Mountain Film Festival for his documentary The Ascent of Everest which featured footage of Sir Edmund Hillary.

Filmography 
Joe Petrosino: A Shot in the Dark (2006)
Le quattro porte del deserto (2006)
The Ascent of Everest (2019)

References

External links
 

1955 births
Italian documentary filmmakers
Italian film directors
Living people